The 1999–2000 Sheffield Shield season was the 98th season of the Sheffield Shield, the domestic first-class cricket competition of Australia. Queensland won the championship.

Naming
In November 1999, the Australian Cricket Board (ACB) announced that the winner of the interstate first-class competition would be awarded the Pura Milk Cup, instead of the Sheffield Shield, under a sponsorship arrangement with National Foods.

Table

Final

References

Sheffield Shield
Sheffield Shield
Sheffield Shield seasons